Brunner's glands (or duodenal glands) are compound tubular submucosal glands found  in that portion of the duodenum which is above the hepatopancreatic sphincter (i.e  sphincter of Oddi). It also contains submucosa which creates special glands. The main function of these glands is to produce a mucus-rich alkaline secretion i.e. mucous (containing bicarbonate) in order to:
 protect the duodenum from the acidic content of chyme (which is introduced into the duodenum from the stomach);
 provide an alkaline condition for the intestinal enzymes to be active, thus enabling absorption to take place;
 lubricate the intestinal walls.

They also secrete epidermal growth factor, which inhibits parietal and chief cells of the stomach from secreting acid and their digestive enzymes. This is another form of protection for the duodenum.

They are the distinguishing feature of the duodenum, and are named for the Swiss physician who first described them, Johann Conrad Brunner.

Structure

Histology
The duodenum can be distinguished from the jejunum and ileum by the presence of Brunner's glands in the submucosa.

Function
The Brunner glands, which empty into the intestinal glands, secrete an alkaline fluid composed of mucin, which exerts a physiologic anti-acid function by coating the duodenal epithelium, therefore protecting it from the acid chyme of the stomach. Furthermore, in response to the presence of acid in the duodenum, these glands secrete pepsinogen and urogastrone, which inhibit gastric acid secretion.

Clinical significance
Hyperplasia of Brunner glands with a lesion greater than 1 cm was initially described as a Brunner gland adenoma. Several features of these lesions favor their designation as hamartomas, including the lack of encapsulation; the mixture of acini, smooth muscles, adipose tissue, Paneth cells, and mucosal glands; and the lack of any cell atypia. These hamartomas are rare, with approximately 150 cases described in the literature. It is estimated that they represent approximately 5–10% of benign duodenal tumors. They are variable in size, typically 1–3 cm, with only a few reported cases of lesions larger than 5 cm.

Most patients with Brunner gland hamartomas are asymptomatic or have nonspecific complaints such as nausea, bloating, or vague abdominal pain.

Most reports in the literature describe local surgical resection of Brunner gland hamartoma via duodenotomy. Increasingly, successful endoscopic resection has been reported and is primarily used for pedunculated Brunner gland hamartomas. The endoscopic approach in selective cases appears to be safe, less invasive, and less costly.

See also
Peutz–Jeghers syndrome

References

External links
  - "Digestive System: Alimentary Canal: pyloro/duodenal junction, duodenum"
  - "Digestive System: Alimentary Canal: pyloro/duodenal junction"
  - "Digestive System: Alimentary Canal: duodenum, plicae circularis"

Digestive system